Ministry of Economy and Labour is a Polish abolished government administration office in charge of economy, labor, regional development, tourism.

The Ministry was established by the Regulation of the Council of Ministers on 2 May 2004. It was abolished by the regulation of the Council of Ministers in 2005, and organizational units were incorporated into the new Ministry of Economy.

List of ministers (2004–2005)

External links
 Official government website of Poland

References

 
 
Poland,2004
2004 establishments in Poland